Furness Vale is a village in the High Peak district of Derbyshire, England, between New Mills and Whaley Bridge. It is bisected by the A6 road and the Peak Forest Canal, whose towpath is followed by the Goyt Way, part of the  Midshires Way. It comes under the administration of Whaley Bridge town council and has a population of approximately 1,500.

The village has a small community primary school for boys and girls aged 4–11. For secondary education, children travel to Chapel-en-le-Frith, New Mills, Hope Valley or Buxton. There is one pub, The Crossing (the Soldier Dick on the A6 closed in 2022), a social club, a railway station and a fish and chip shop.  The post office closed around 2015 and has been converted into a domestic dwelling. The social club is now used as a post office twice a week.

Since 2008, the village has hosted a free music event on its football field in order to raise funds for the development of the field itself. It is held on a Saturday during the summer months and is organised by a committee of local residents.

See also
Furness Vale railway station

References

External links

Villages in Derbyshire
Towns and villages of the Peak District
Whaley Bridge